Lathom South is a civil parish in the West Lancashire district of Lancashire, England, situated near the towns of Ormskirk and Skelmersdale. The parish council was established in 2007, and the area, which includes the hamlets of Blaguegate and Scarth Hill, has historical ties to the neighbouring parish of Lathom. As of 2011, Lathom South has a population of 657.

History
The whole of Lathom was formerly part of Lathom and Burscough Urban District, which in 1931 was merged into Ormskirk Urban District. In 1974, under the Local Government Act 1972, it was subsumed into the newly created district of West Lancashire, and the area now covered by Lathom South became part of the Derby Ward of Ormskirk. On 31 March 2003, a public meeting was held by local residents to discuss the need for local representation, and a working group was set up to consider the available options. At a second meeting held on 1 July 2003, it was agreed to petition for the formation of a parish council. Lathom South Parish Council was established in May 2007.

Geography
Lathom South sits directly between the towns of Ormskirk and Skelmersdale, with the civil parishes of Lathom and Newburgh to the north and northeast, and Bickerstaffe to the south. The northeastern boundary with Newburgh is formed by the River Tawd. The hamlets of Blaguegate and Scarth Hill are located within Lathom South.

Demography
According to the United Kingdom Census 2011, Lathom South parish had a population of 657 people living in 281 households, with a roughly even distribution between males and females.

Of the 498 residents aged between 16 and 74,  were regarded as economically active, and of those  were unemployed.

Transport
The B5240 road also passes through the parish, running from north to south between Lathom and Bickerstaffe.

See also

Listed buildings in Lathom South

References

External links

Lathom South Parish Council

Civil parishes in Lancashire
Geography of the Borough of West Lancashire